Merry Ole Soul is a Christmas album by jazz pianist and arranger Duke Pearson, featuring performances recorded in 1969 and originally released on the Blue Note label.

Reception
The AllMusic review awarded the album 2 out of 5 stars.

Track listing
 "Sleigh Ride" (Leroy Anderson, Mitchell Parish) - 6:25
 "The Little Drummer Boy" (Katherine K. Davis, Henry Onorati, Harry Simeone) - 5:47
 "Have Yourself a Merry Little Christmas" (Ralph Blane, Hugh Martin) - 2:00
 "Jingle Bells" (James Pierpont) - 5:10
 "Santa Claus Is Coming to Town" (J. Fred Coots, Haven Gillespie) - 4:07
 "Go Tell It on the Mountain" (Traditional) - 3:44
 "Wassail Song" (Traditional) - 3:04
 "Silent Night" (Franz Gruber, Joseph Mohr) - 4:12
 "O Little Town of Bethlehem" (Phillips Brooks, Lewis Redner) - 1:14
Recorded at Rudy Van Gelder Studio, Englewood Cliffs, New Jersey, on February 25 (track 1) & August 19 (tracks 2-9), 1969
A 2004 import CD reissue of the album on Toshiba EMI includes an outtake from the sessions, "Old Fashioned Christmas", as a bonus track.

Personnel
Duke Pearson - piano, celeste (tracks 1, 3)
Bob Cranshaw - bass (tracks 1–8)
Mickey Roker - drums (tracks 1–8)
Airto Moreira - percussion (tracks 4, 5, & 7)

References

Blue Note Records albums
Duke Pearson albums
1969 Christmas albums
Christmas albums by American artists
Albums recorded at Van Gelder Studio
Jazz Christmas albums